Af Ruugleey is a populated place in the northeastern Bari region of Somalia. It is situated in the Iskushuban District of the autonomous Puntland region.

References

Populated places in Bari, Somalia